Guddu Engineer is a 2016 Indian Short romantic drama film directed and co-produced by Nikkhil Advani and written by Aseem Arora. It starred Prabuddh Dyma and Pranali Ghogare.

Plot
The story revolves around Guddu, an engineering student, who is having a near perfect life. To impress his girlfriend, Sonia, Guddu makes a wish list and manages to achieve all of it. However, a simple choice between love and hate changes it all.

Cast
 Prabuddh Dyma as Guddu
 Pranali Ghogare as Sonia
 Ananya Banerjee as Sonia's friend

Awards

References

External links
 

Indian short films
Films directed by Nikkhil Advani
2010s Hindi-language films
2016 action thriller films
2016 drama films
2016 short films
2016 films
Films scored by Arjuna Harjai
Indian drama films